James Michael Wolf (born July 24, 1969) is an American Major League Baseball umpire. He joined the major league staff in 1999 after working in the Arizona Rookie League, the South Atlantic League, the California League, the Texas League and the Pacific Coast League. He wears uniform number 28.

Umpiring career
On October 4, 2001, Wolf served as third base umpire when Rickey Henderson broke Ty Cobb's runs scored record.

Wolf drew criticism from ESPN announcers after he ejected Chicago Cubs starting pitcher Ted Lilly at the start of a game on June 10, 2007, against the Atlanta Braves. Wolf ruled that Lilly had intentionally thrown at the batter's head, and immediately ejected the pitcher. While such a penalty is uncommon without a formal warning to both teams, such action is permitted by baseball's rules.

On May 9, 2010, Wolf was the home plate umpire for Dallas Braden's perfect game. He was the second base umpire for Armando Galarraga's near-perfect game on June 2, 2010. On July 9, 2011, Wolf was the home plate umpire when Derek Jeter got his 3,000th hit against the Tampa Bay Rays.

Wolf missed several months during the 2013 season due to an apparent back injury. He worked a rehab assignment at Triple-A Charlotte the weekend of July 18–19 en route to a return to the Major Leagues.

On August 2, 2015, Wolf was involved in a series of controversial events in a game between the Toronto Blue Jays and the Kansas City Royals. According to National Post sportswriter John Lott, "Umpire Jim Wolf lost control of the game."  The controversy was based upon a warning by Wolf to both teams after Blue Jays batter Josh Donaldson was struck by a pitch in the first inning by Edinson Vólquez. The benches were cleared after a number of pitches could have resulted in the Royals' pitcher's ejection, and did not, but a pitch by the Blue Jays' relief pitcher Aaron Sanchez that hit Alcides Escobar immediately resulted in Sanchez being ejected. Former Blue Jays catcher and former Sportsnet baseball analyst Gregg Zaun criticized Wolf for his inability to enforce the warning that was issued in the first.

Wolf was at third base for Arizona Diamondbacks pitcher Tyler Gilbert’s no hitter against the San Diego Padres on August 14th, 2021.

Post-season and All-Star games
Wolf has officiated five Division Series (2007, 2010, 2014, 2015, 2019 National League Division Series), five League Championship Series (2011, 2016, 2017, 2018, 2021), three Wild Card Games (2016, 2018, 2021) and two World Series (2015, 2019). He has also worked one All-Star Game (2010).

Personal life
Wolf is married and resides in Ahwatukee, Arizona. His younger brother Randy was a pitcher in the major leagues from  until . To avoid a conflict of interest, he would be removed from assignments if his crew was assigned to work any game where Randy was on either team's roster.

See also 

 List of Major League Baseball umpires

References

External links
Major league profile
Retrosheet

1969 births
Living people
People from West Hills, Los Angeles
Sportspeople from Phoenix, Arizona
Major League Baseball umpires